Oleksandr Serhiyovych Pryzetko (born 31 January 1971) is a Ukrainian professional football manager and a former player.

Career
He made his professional debut in the Soviet Second League in 1988 for FC Mayak Kharkiv.

Honours
 Ukrainian Premier League champion: 1994, 1995.
 Russian Premier League Cup finalist: 2003.

References

External links
 

1971 births
Living people
People from Izmail
Soviet footballers
Ukrainian footballers
Ukrainian expatriate footballers
Ukraine international footballers
Russian Premier League players
Ukrainian Premier League players
Soviet Top League players
FC Olympik Kharkiv players
FC Metalist Kharkiv players
FC Dynamo Kyiv players
FC Tyumen players
FC Torpedo Moscow players
FC Torpedo-2 players
FC Chernomorets Novorossiysk players
FC Arsenal Tula players
Expatriate footballers in Russia
Ukrainian football managers
FC Metalist Kharkiv managers
FC Polissya Zhytomyr managers
Ukrainian Premier League managers
Ukrainian Second League managers
Ukrainian expatriate sportspeople in Russia
Association football midfielders
Association football forwards
FC Metalist 1925 Kharkiv managers
Sportspeople from Odesa Oblast